Minnesota State Highway 237 (MN 237) is a short  highway in central Minnesota, which runs from its intersection with Stearns County State-Aid Highways 12 and 30 in New Munich and continues north to its northern terminus at its interchange with Interstate 94 and Stearns County State-Aid Highway 65 (Thunder Road) in Oak Township near Melrose. MN 237 passes through the city of New Munich.

Route description
Highway 237 serves as a short north–south connector route between Interstate 94 and the town of New Munich in central Minnesota.

Highway 237 is also known as Main Street in New Munich.

The route is legally defined as Route 237 in the Minnesota Statutes

History
Highway 237 was authorized on July 1, 1949.

The route was paved when it was marked.

The 2020 Minnesota Legislature authorized removal of the route, to become effective when a turnback agreement is reached with Stearns County.

Major intersections

References

External links

Highway 237 at the Unofficial Minnesota Highways Page

237
Transportation in Stearns County, Minnesota